Puerto Rico Highway 549 (PR-549) is a tertiary state road in Ponce, Puerto Rico. The road has both of its endpoints, as well as all of its length, entirely within Barrio Canas in the municipality of Ponce. The road is a country road that runs north to south, entirely in the western portion of Barrio Canas. Its southern terminus is at a dirt path that leads to the westernmost endpoint of PR-500 in barrio Canas and its northern end is at PR-132 also in barrio Canas.

Major intersections

See also
 
 
 List of highways in Ponce, Puerto Rico
 List of highways numbered 549

References

External links
 
 Guía de Carreteras Principales, Expresos y Autopistas 

549
Roads in Ponce, Puerto Rico